Irridu (Irrite) was a city in northwestern Mesopotamia, likely located between Harran and Carchemish. It flourished in the middle and late Bronze Age before being destroyed by Assyria.

History
The city was first mentioned in a letter from the king of Carchemish to Zimri-Lim of Mari. The letter suggested that Irridu had been a subject of Carchemish, and subsequently it came under the rule of Yamhad.

In the middle of the 18th century BC, the city was ruled by Yarim-Lim, who was the brother of Abba-El I, king of Yamhad. Zitraddu, the governor of the city, rebelled against Yarim-Lim; Abba-El I quashed the rebels violently to the extent of destroying the city and he compensated his brother by giving him Alalakh.

After the fall of Aleppo, the capital of Yamhad, to the Hittite king Mursili I, Irridu came under the control of Mittani. The Hittites, under prince Piyassili, occupied Irridu in their advance upon the Mittanian capital Washukanni and after the Hittites retreated, it became a regional center for Mittani until it was conquered by Adad-nirari I, king of Assyria.

Assyrian Conquest
King Wasashatta of Mittani rebelled against the Assyrians and sought the help of the Hittites, but received none. Adad-nirari I attacked Mittani and conquered most of its cities. The royal family of Mittani escaped to Irridu but the Assyrians found them and deported them to Assyria.

Irridu and many cities in its area were set on fire, destroyed, and sowed with salty plants.

See also

 Hurrians
 Yamhad
 History of the Hittites
 Mitanni

References

Citations

Populated places disestablished in the 2nd millennium BC
Ancient Syria
Hurrian cities
Lost ancient cities and towns
Razed cities